The Roaring River is a  long tributary of the South Fork Kings River, in the Sierra Nevada of Fresno County, California. The entire course of the river is within Kings Canyon National Park. 

The river originates in the Great Western Divide at Triple Divide Peak, and flows northward through Cloud Canyon before turning northwest, entering Sugarloaf Valley, where it receives Sugarloaf Creek from the west. From there it flows north through a deep and inaccessible gorge, forming the Roaring River Falls near its confluence with the South Fork in Cedar Grove.

See also
List of rivers of California

References

Rivers of Fresno County, California
Tulare Basin watershed
Waterfalls of California